Bernard Hill (born 17 December 1944) is an English actor. He is known for playing Théoden, King of Rohan, in The Lord of the Rings film trilogy, Captain Edward Smith in Titanic, and Luther Plunkitt, the Warden of San Quentin Prison in the Clint Eastwood film True Crime. Hill was also known for playing roles in television dramas, including Yosser Hughes, the troubled "hard man" whose life is falling apart in Alan Bleasdale's Boys from the Blackstuff in the 1980s, and more recently, as the Duke of Norfolk in the BBC adaptation of Hilary Mantel's Wolf Hall.

Hill has the honor of being the only actor to have appeared in more than one film that won 11 Academy Awards, for his roles in The Lord of the Rings: The Return of the King and Titanic; he did not appear in Ben-Hur, the only other film in history (as of 2022) that won 11 Oscar awards.

Early life
Hill was born in Blackley, Manchester. He was brought up in a Catholic family of miners. Hill attended Xaverian College, and then Manchester Polytechnic School of Drama at the same time as Richard Griffiths. He graduated  with a diploma in theatre in 1970.

Career
In 1976, Hill was seen as Police Constable Cluff in the Granada Television series Crown Court, the episode entitled "The Jolly Swagmen"

Boys from the Blackstuff
Hill first came to prominence as Yosser Hughes, a working-class Liverpudlian man ultimately driven to the edge by an uncaring welfare system, in Alan Bleasdale's BBC Play for Today programme, The Black Stuff, and its series sequel, Boys from the Blackstuff. His character's much-repeated phrase Gizza job ("Give us a job") became popular with protesters against Margaret Thatcher's Conservative government, because of the high unemployment of the time.

Later roles
Hill then appeared as Sergeant Putnam in Gandhi (1982), directed by Richard Attenborough. Next for him was Roger Donaldson’s The Bounty (1984), a fourth dramatisation of the mutiny on HMS Bounty.

He had previously taken smaller parts in a number of British television dramas, appearing in  I, Claudius in 1976 as the character Gratus.

In 1985, he played the lead role in a TV dramatisation of John Lennon's life, A Journey in the Life. In addition to TV roles, Hill appeared on stage in The Cherry Orchard, and the title roles in Macbeth and A View from the Bridge.

Hill appeared as Joe Bradshaw in Shirley Valentine (1989), about a Liverpool housewife (Pauline Collins) who was a former anti-establishment rebel and engages in an extramarital affair. Hill added more prominent films to his resume, including Mountains of the Moon (1990), Skallagrigg (1994) and Madagascar Skin (1995).

In the mid-1990s, Hill began appearing in films more regularly. Hill then portrayed Captain Edward J. Smith in Titanic (1997), by James Cameron.

Hill played Philos in The Scorpion King (2002), starring Dwayne "The Rock" Johnson, Michael Clarke Duncan and Kelly Hu.

He held a minor role in the 2008 film Valkyrie, as the commanding general of the 10th Panzer Division of the German Afrika Korps and as a voice actor for Sir Walter Beck in Fable III (2010).

He plays Samuel Cotton, who runs a sweet factory with his son in the 2014 three-part BBC drama series about Manchester From There To Here.

Hill appears as Thomas Howard, 3rd Duke of Norfolk in the 2015 six-part BBC adaptation of Hilary Mantel's novels, Wolf Hall.

Personal life

Hill is married to Marianne, with whom he has a son named Gabriel. He lives in Suffolk. 

Hill is a longtime supporter of Manchester United FC. 

In 2019, Hill received an honorary degree from the University of East Anglia.

Filmography

Films

Television

Theatre

Video games

References and notes

External links

 
 
 
 
 Interview with BBC Suffolk

1944 births
Living people
20th-century English male actors
21st-century English male actors
English male film actors
English male stage actors
English male television actors
English male voice actors
English Roman Catholics
Male actors from Manchester
Outstanding Performance by a Cast in a Motion Picture Screen Actors Guild Award winners
People from Blackley